Enterprise School District is a public school district based in Enterprise, Mississippi, U.S.A.

Schools
Enterprise High School
Enterprise Middle School
Enterprise Elementary School

Demographics

2006-07 school year
There were a total of 903 students enrolled in the Enterprise School District during the 2006–2007 school year. The gender makeup of the district was 50% female and 50% male. The racial makeup of the district was 11.41% African American, 86.71% White, 1.55% Hispanic, 0.22% Native American, and 0.11% Asian. 35.4% of the district's students were eligible to receive free lunch.

Previous school years

Accountability statistics

See also
List of school districts in Mississippi

References

External links
Enterprise School District

Education in Clarke County, Mississippi
School districts in Mississippi